Rock python may refer to:

 Central African rock python (Python sebae), a non-venomous snake species found in sub-Saharan Africa
 Southern African rock python (Python natalensis), a non-venomous snake of southern Africa, closely related to the Central African rock python
 Indian python or Asiatic rock python (Python molurus), a non-venomous snake species found in southern Asia
 Rock Python, a fictional comic book character

Animal common name disambiguation pages